Dulith Gayan (born 3 September 1993) is a Sri Lankan cricketer. He made his List A debut for Hambantota District in the 2016–17 Districts One Day Tournament on 26 March 2017 and his Twenty20 debut on 8 January 2020, for Unichela Sports Club in the 2019–20 SLC Twenty20 Tournament.

References

External links
 

1993 births
Living people
Sri Lankan cricketers
Place of birth missing (living people)
Hambantota District cricketers